Crozon-sur-Vauvre is a commune in the Indre department in the Centre-Val de Loire region of France. Citizens of the commune are called Crozonnais.

Crozon-sur-Vauvre was in the historic province of Berry up to 1790.

Prior to the Redécoupage cantonal de 2014 it was in the historic canton of Aigurande.

Population

Geography
Crozon-sur-Vauvre lies about 46 kilometres south-southeast of the city of Châteauroux, on the river Vauvre. Crozon-sur-Vauvre's neighbouring settlements are Saint-Denis-de-Jouhet to the north and northwest, Chassignolles to the northeast, Crevant to the east, La Forêt-du-Temple to the south, Aigurande to the west and southwest, and La Buxerette in the west.

Places of interest
 Village church dedicated to Saint Germain.
 Château de Lalande, 16th century, with a separate private chapel dedicated to Saint Joseph, built in 1866.

Transport
The nearest airport is Châteauroux-Centre.

See also
Communes of the Indre department

References

Communes of Indre